Dimitrios Manganas (born 24 February 1978) is a Greek former swimmer who competed in the 1996 Summer Olympics, in the 2000 Summer Olympics, and in the 2004 Summer Olympics.

References

1978 births
Living people
Greek male swimmers
Greek male freestyle swimmers
Olympic swimmers of Greece
Swimmers at the 1996 Summer Olympics
Swimmers at the 2000 Summer Olympics
Swimmers at the 2004 Summer Olympics
European Aquatics Championships medalists in swimming
Mediterranean Games gold medalists for Greece
Mediterranean Games medalists in swimming
Swimmers at the 2001 Mediterranean Games
21st-century Greek people